Harry Stephen Harkness (July 17, 1880 – January 23, 1919) was an American aviator and racing driver.

Biography
He was born in Cleveland, Ohio on July 17, 1880 to Standard Oil heir Lamon V. Harkness.

In 1918 his personal yacht was taken by the United States Navy, becoming  and was credited with sinking 3 German U-boats during World War I. Harkness sued the US government in 1918 because he did not believe that he was adequately compensated for the value of his yacht. 

He died of influenza in 1919, at his home, 270 Park Avenue, New York - a short four years following the death of his father Lamon V. Harkness.
In 1918, Harry commissioned the prestigious Schmieg/Hungate/Kotzian furniture manufacturer to exclusively create the Artcase for his Steinway Model B from Steinway & Sons. The piano was discovered in a mansion in 2008 and has been fully restored.

Following his death, his first wife, Mrs Marie M Cowan (née Harkness née Marbeck), whom he married in 1906 and divorced in 1916, sued for his entire $20 million estate, claiming he was of unsound mind when leaving the estate to his second wife, Mrs Florence Streuber Harkness née Gaines.

Legacy
Harry was an avid race car driver and won the first "Race to the Clouds", the Mount Washington Hillclimb Auto Race. Harry Harkness led a group of investors who bought the Sheepshead Bay Race Track, a thoroughbred horse racing facility they converted to use as an auto racing track. Following Harkness' unexpected death the facility was sold to real estate developers.  As a noted racer of the day, he was retroactively awarded the 1902 American Automobile Association National Championship in 1951. 1902 was the first year of AAA sanctioned racing. One of Harry's more famous races was against Henry Ford.

Aviation
Harkness financed the building of many early airplanes.  On March 4, 1911, he contracted early aviator Charles F. Walsh to build an airplane for use by his chief mechanic John Kiley at the Harkness camp established on North Island in San Diego, CA.

Walsh delivered the plane to the aviation camp at North Island on April 7, 1911.  This Harkness airplane was a Curtiss copy, but with four Farman-type ailerons mounted flush to the end of all four wings replacing the Curtiss-style ailerons normally located between the upper and lower wing.  The upper and lower ailerons were connected to each other via a vertical pole and operated in unison.  They were moved via wires connected to the pilots steering wheel post.  The wings also had about 1/3 more surface area than a Curtiss, spanning 40 feet with a 4.5 foot chord.  It measured 37 feet from the tip of the forward elevator to the tail of the rudder.  Both the rudder and front elevator were double surfaced, or box-type, with the rudder being enclosed by a pair of two foot square vertical wings on either side of the horizontal surface.  There was no elevator function to the tail.  The tail and elevator surfaces measured approximately two feet by six feet and were set much farther out from the wings than a normal Curtiss.  It was powered by a seven-cylinder Macomber rotary engine that reportedly weighed 250 pounds, generated 450 pounds of thrust, and produced 60 hp to turn an eight-foot propeller.  According to at least one source, Walsh added "silver dust" to the unbleached muslin of the flying surfaces.  This earned the aircraft the name "Silver Dart".

See also
Mount Washington Hillclimb Auto Race

References

External links
Early Aviators - Harry S. Harkness
 Information and photos of Sheepshead Bay Race Track

1880 births
1919 deaths
American aviators
Harry
Sportspeople from Cleveland
Racing drivers from Ohio
Deaths from the Spanish flu pandemic in New York (state)